The Mont-Tremblant Champ Car Grand Prix was an auto race in the Champ Car World Series. It was held from 1967 to 1968 and again in 2007. It was held at Circuit Mont-Tremblant, in Mont-Tremblant, Quebec, Canada.

The race replaced the Grand Prix of Montreal in the Champ Car circuit, and was held in a rural zone north of Montreal. The circuit had previously held a number of significant open-wheel championship events: USAC IndyCar races in 1967 and 1968, before the establishment of the Champ Car Grand Prix; the Sports Car Club of America's Formula 5000 championship held events in 1969 and 1970; and the track held the Formula One Canadian Grand Prix in 1968 and 1970.

The only event was held on July 1, 2007, as the sixth round of the 2007 Champ Car World Series Season. Robert Doornbos won his first career Champ Car race, with Sébastien Bourdais and Will Power rounding out the podium. The unification of Champ Car and the Indy Racing League was announced on February 22, 2008, and the Mont-Tremblant Grand Prix's future was left in doubt. It was confirmed on March 5, 2008, that the race was cancelled.

Race winners

References

Champ Car races
Auto races in Canada
Sports competitions in Quebec
Tourist attractions in Laurentides